Gumilev or Gumilyov is the surname of the following persons:

Nikolai Gumilev (1886–1921), Russian poet of the Silver Age
Lev Gumilev (1912–1992), Soviet/Russian historian, son of Nikolai Gumilev and Anna Akhmatova